Paulius Jankūnas (born 29 April 1984) is a retired Lithuanian professional basketball player who mainly played for Žalgiris Kaunas of the Lithuanian Basketball League (LKL) and the EuroLeague. He was also a member of the senior Lithuanian national team. Jankūnas played at either center or power forward, with power forward being his main position. He earned an All-EuroLeague Second Team selection in 2018.

Early years
Jankūnas played two seasons with the LKKA-Žalgiris, he and led them to a LKAL (Lithuanian League 2nd Division) title in 2003. He was named the Lithuanian 2nd Division's league MVP, after averaging 20.0 points, 12.3 rebounds, and 1.5 blocks per game.

He competed at the Reebok Eurocamp in Treviso, in 2003.

Professional career

Žalgiris Kaunas

After playing in the Lithuanian 2nd Division with LKKA-Žalgiris, during the 2002–03 season, Jankūnas made his debut with the Lithuanian EuroLeague club Žalgiris Kaunas, in the 2003–04 season. He was originally an early entry candidate for the 2005 NBA draft, before withdrawing his name from consideration.

Jankūnas averaged 13.8 points and 8.0 rebounds per game, in the 2008–09 EuroLeague season, and scored a season-high 23 points, in a win against the Polish League club Asseco Prokom Sopot, on 18 December 2008. However, Žalgiris Kaunas finished the season with a 2–8 record, and did not qualify to the competition's Top 16 stage. Jankūnas was named the 2008–09 season's Baltic League MVP, after averaging 15.4 points and 7.7 rebounds per game.

Khimki Moscow Region
On 14 August 2009, Jankūnas signed a two-year contract with the Russian EuroLeague club Khimki Moscow Region. Jankunas only played one season with Khimki Moscow Region (2009–10), and competed with them in three leagues that season (2009–10 EuroLeague, 2009–10 VTB United League, and 2009–10 Russian Super League A).

Return to Žalgiris Kaunas
On 24 July 2010, it was announced that Jankūnas was coming back to Žalgiris Kaunas. In May 2018, he was named to the All-EuroLeague Second Team, of the 2017–18 season.

During his time with Žalgiris Kaunas, Jankūnas helped the club to win thirteen Lithuanian League championships (2004, 2005, 2007, 2008, 2011–2019), and seven Lithuanian Cups, as he won five Lithuanian LKF Cups (2006, 2007, 2011, 2012, 2015), and two Lithuanian King Mindaugas Cups (2017, 2018). With Žalgiris Kaunas, he also won the Lithuanian Super Cup in 2012, and four Baltic League championships (2005, 2008, 2011, 2012).

On 12 August 2021, Jankūnas re-signed with the team.

National team career

Lithuanian junior national team
Jankūnas was a member of the Lithuanian junior national teams. He played at the 2002 FIBA Europe Under-18 Championship, and at the 2003 FIBA Under-19 World Cup, where the Lithuanians won silver medals. Jankūnas also won a bronze medal at the 2004 FIBA Europe Under-20 Championship, which he led in rebounding (12.3 rebounds per game), in addition to posting 12.5 points per game.

He also helped Lithuania win the gold medal at the 2005 FIBA Under-21 World Cup. He averaged 12.8 points and 8.6 rebounds per game during the tournament.

Lithuanian senior national team
Jankūnas was a member of the senior Lithuanian national team, for the first time at a major FIBA tournament, at the 2005 EuroBasket, where Lithuania finished in fifth place. During that tournament, he averaged 8.2 points and 4.0 rebounds per game. He also helped the Lithuanians win a bronze medal at the 2007 EuroBasket, and another bronze medal, at the 2010 FIBA World Championship. He won a silver medal with Lithuania at the 2015 EuroBasket.

Jankūnas also competed with Lithuania at the following tournaments: the 2006 FIBA World Championship, the 2011 EuroBasket, the 2012 FIBA World Olympic Qualifying Tournament, the 2012 Summer Olympics, the 2014 FIBA World Cup, the 2016 Summer Olympics, and the 2019 FIBA World Cup.

Player profile
A well built 2.05 m (6 ft. 8  in.) tall power forward, Jankūnas is a very good rebounder, and is also a good scorer. He prefers to score on the inside, and he often draws fouls from opposing team's players. He can also play as a stretch four, due to his consistent mid-range and three point shot.

Career statistics

EuroLeague

|-
| style="text-align:left;"| 2003–04
| style="text-align:left;" rowspan=6| Žalgiris Kaunas
| 16 || 5 || 13.6 || .526 || .000 || .636 || 2.9 || .6 || .5 || .3 || 4.6 || 5.1
|-
| style="text-align:left;"| 2004–05
| 20 || 12 || 18.8 || .544 || .143 || .581 || 4.2 || .6 || .7 || .1 || 6.2 || 7.7
|-
| style="text-align:left;"| 2005–06
| 20 || 10 || 24.5 || .468 || .250 || .714 || 6.8 || 1.1 || .4 || .3 || 10.8 || 12.3
|-
| style="text-align:left;"| 2006–07
| 13 || 8 || 27.0 || .483 || .208 || .673 || 4.2 || 1.0 || 1.3 || .2 || 9.5 || 12.1
|-
| style="text-align:left;"| 2007–08
| 20 || 19 || 21.6 || .469 || .324 || .771 || 4.8 || .8 || .9 || .4 || 8.6 || 9.4
|-
| style="text-align:left;"| 2008–09
| 9 || 9 || 31.1 || .440 || .296 || .778 || 8.0 || 1.2 || 1.0 || .6 || 13.8 || 14.8
|-
| style="text-align:left;"| 2009–10
| style="text-align:left;"| Khimki Moscow
| 16 || 16 || 25.0 || .475 || .377 || .773 || 4.9 || .8 || .8 || .3 || 8.2 || 9.6
|-
| style="text-align:left;"| 2010–11
| style="text-align:left;" rowspan=12|Žalgiris Kaunas
| 16 || 8 || 26.3 || .476 || .152 || .818 || 6.9 || .9 || .6 || .4 || 9.4 || 11.7
|-
| style="text-align:left;"| 2011–12
| 16 || 16 || 23.4 || .447 || .333 || .727 || 5.6 || .8 || .8 || .3 || 7.8 || 8.8
|-
| style="text-align:left;"| 2012–13
| 17 || 16 || 24.8 || .465 || .292 || .844 || 4.8 || 1.2 || .8 || .2 || 8.2 || 9.2
|-
| style="text-align:left;"| 2013–14
| 21 || 21 || 26.2 || .465 || .257 || .771 || 6.5 || 1.9 || 1.1 || .3 || 8.8 || 12.0
|-
| style="text-align:left;"| 2014–15
| 24 || 23 || 24.2 || .480 || .300 || .800 || 6.5 || 1.1 || .6 || .5 || 9.1 || 12.0
|-
| style="text-align:left;"| 2015–16
| 24 || 23 || 25.3 || .540 || .310 || .838 || 6.2 || 1.5 || .9 || .2 || 12.3 || 15.5
|-
| style="text-align:left;"| 2016–17
| 30 || 30 || 23.4 || .548 || .396 || .868 || 6.1 || 1.5 || .6 || .4 || 13.0 || 16.8
|-
| style="text-align:left;"| 2017–18
| 35 || 34 || 22.1 || .576 || .375 || .833 || 4.9 || 1.4 || .5 || .3 || 11.3 || 13.7
|-
| style="text-align:left;"| 2018–19
| 17 || 9 || 16.0 || .500 || .250 || .892 || 3.1 || .9 || .2 || .2 || 6.2 || 7.5
|-
| style="text-align:left;"| 2019–20
| 27 || 12 || 13.7 || .384 || .143 || .759 || 3.1 || .8 || .4 || .1 || 3.0 || 4.9
|-
| style="text-align:left;"| 2020–21
| 34 || 8 || 15.9 || .436 || .276 || .911 || 4.4 || 1.0 || .5 || .1 || 3.9 || 7.1
|-
| style="text-align:left;"| 2021–22
| 17 || 4 || 12.7 || .423 || .409 || .909 || 2.6 || .6 || .5 || .2 || 3.7 || 4.4
|- class="sortbottom"
| style="text-align:center;" colspan=2| Career
| 392 || 283 || 21.4 || .490 || .297 || .793 || 5.1 || 1.1 || .6 || .3 || 8.3 || 10.4

Personal life
Jankūnas married his wife, Ieva, in the summer of 2007.

References

External links

Paulius Jankūnas at euroleague.net
Paulius Jankūnas at fiba.com
Paulius Jankūnas at bbaltics.com
Paulius Jankūnas at besport.com
Paulius Jankūnas at eurobasket.com
Paulius Jankūnas at draftexpress.com
Paulius Jankūnas at mackolik.com
Paulius Jankūnas at msn.com

1984 births
Living people
2006 FIBA World Championship players
2010 FIBA World Championship players
2014 FIBA Basketball World Cup players
2019 FIBA Basketball World Cup players
Basketball players at the 2012 Summer Olympics
Basketball players at the 2016 Summer Olympics
BC Khimki players
BC Žalgiris players
Centers (basketball)
Lithuanian expatriate basketball people in Russia
Lithuanian men's basketball players
Olympic basketball players of Lithuania
Power forwards (basketball)
Basketball players from Kaunas